Major General Sir Frederick Cuthbert Poole,  (3 August 1869 – 20 December 1936) was a British Army officer of the First World War and a Conservative parliamentary candidate.

Career
Poole attended the Royal Military Academy, Woolwich and was commissioned into the Royal Artillery in February 1889. He was promoted to lieutenant on 15 February 1892, and served in the Tirah Campaign in India from 1897 to 1898. Promotion to captain followed on 14 June 1899. Poole served in the Second Boer War in South Africa, for which he left on the SS British Prince in March 1900. He was attached to the ammunition column of the 8th Division, and was later in command of P Section Pom-poms, and was present at the engagements at Botha′s Pass, the storming of Alleman′s Nek (June 1900), the Battle of Bergendal and operations near Lydenburg (August 1900). For his service, he was twice mentioned in despatches (including the final despatch by Lord Kitchener dated 23 June 1902), and was awarded the Distinguished Service Order (DSO). Following the end of the war, Poole left Cape Town for England on the SS Simla in July 1902. From 1903 to 1904 he was with the Somaliland Field Force and participated in the Somaliland Campaign. He then saw action in Northern Nigeria in 1904 and was promoted to major in 1909. He retired from the army in 1914.

Poole was recalled to service following the outbreak of the First World War in 1914. He became a lieutenant colonel in 1915, and was promoted to temporary major general in 1917. That same year he was made a Companion of the Order of St Michael and St George, and was made a Companion of the Order of the Bath in 1918. He served as General Officer Commanding, North Russia Expeditionary Force between 1918 and 1919, and was made a Knight Commander of the Order of the British Empire in 1919. Poole retired as an honorary major general in 1920. Poole was honoured by several foreign governments during his military career, including being made a member of the French Legion of Honour (Officer) in 1916, the Russian Imperial Order of Saint Stanislaus (First Class) and Order of St. Vladimir (Third Class) in 1918, and the Romanian Order of the Crown (Officer) in 1918.

He stood as the Conservative candidate in the 1922 Bodmin by-election, but was defeated by Isaac Foot. He stood again for the seat in the 1922 and 1923 general elections, but was defeated by the incumbent on both occasions. He was a Deputy Lieutenant for Cornwall.

References

External links

1869 births
1936 deaths
British Army generals of World War I
British Army personnel of the Russian Civil War
British Army personnel of the Second Boer War
Companions of the Distinguished Service Order
Companions of the Order of St Michael and St George
Companions of the Order of the Bath
Conservative Party (UK) parliamentary candidates
Deputy Lieutenants of Cornwall
Graduates of the Royal Military Academy, Woolwich
Knights Commander of the Order of the British Empire
Officiers of the Légion d'honneur
Officers of the Order of the Crown (Romania)
Recipients of the Order of St. Vladimir, 3rd class
Royal Artillery officers
Recipients of the Order of Saint Stanislaus (Russian), 1st class